The Deanery of Cadbury represents the Church of England in mid Devon, within the Archdeaconry of Exeter and the Diocese of Exeter. The current rural dean is Matthew Tregenza.

United Benefice of Crediton and Shobrooke with Sandford and Upton Hellions

Parishes within the United Benefice:
Crediton (Holy Cross and the Mother of Him who hung thereon) with St Lawrence, Yeoford (Holy Trinity), Posbury (St Luke) and Posbury (St Francis)
Shobrooke (St Swithin)
Sandford, Devon (St Swithun) with New Buildings (Beacon Church) and Upton Hellions (St Mary the Virgin)

Clergy:
Prebendary Matthew Tregenza Rector 
 Lewis Eden  Assistant Curate

Benefice of North Creedy

Parishes within the Benefice:
Bow (St Bartholomew)
Cheriton Fitzpaine (St Matthew)
Clannaborough (St Petrock)
Coldridge (St Matthew)
Colebrooke (St Andrew)
Down St Mary (St Mary the Virgin) with Knowle (St Boniface)
Kennerleigh (St John the Baptist)
Lapford (St Thomas of Canterbury)
Morchard Bishop (St Mary)
Nymet Rowland see Bow
Poughill (St Michael and All Angels)
Puddington (St Thomas a Beckett)
Stockleigh English (St Mary the Virgin)
Stockleigh Pomeroy (St Mary the Virgin)
Washford Pyne (St Peter)
Woolfardisworthy East (St Mary)
Zeal Monachorum (St Peter)

Clergy:
 Janet May Team Vicar

References

Deaneries of the Church of England
Diocese of Exeter